HMS Tamar is a Batch 2  offshore patrol vessel of the Royal Navy. Named after the River Tamar in England, this is the seventh Royal Navy ship to be named Tamar. She is the fourth Batch 2 River-class vessel to be built and is forward deployed long-term to the Indo-Pacific region with her sister ship .

Construction

On 6 November 2013 it was announced that the Royal Navy had signed an Agreement in Principle to build three new offshore patrol vessels, based on the  design, at a fixed price of £348 million including spares and support. In August 2014, BAE Systems signed the contract to build the ships on the Clyde in Scotland. The Ministry of Defence stated that the Batch 2 ships are capable of being used for constabulary duties such as "counter-terrorism, counter-piracy and anti-smuggling operations". According to BAE Systems, the vessels are designed to deploy globally, conducting anti-piracy, counter-terrorism and anti-smuggling tasks currently conducted by frigates and destroyers. A £287m order, for two further ships, including Tamar, and support for all five Batch 2 ships, was announced on 8 December 2016.

Tamar includes some 29 modifications and enhancements over the  built by BAE Systems for the Brazilian Navy.

Tamar was lowered into the water on 10 October 2018. The vessel began operational sea trials in late 2019. It was commissioned into service on 17 December 2020.

Operational history
In April 2021, Tamar became the first Royal Navy warship to be painted in dazzle camouflage since World War II, prior to Tamars planned deployment with sister ship  to the Asia-Pacific region. On 6 May, Tamar was deployed to Jersey alongside . This was part of a chain of events sparked by a new fishing licence scheme, introduced by the Jersey authorities post Brexit and is alleged by the French to be in contravention of an agreement between the UK and the EU nations and without consultation with the French authorities. On 7 September, Tamar and sister  departed Portsmouth to be forward deployed to the Indo-Pacific region for a minimum of five years.

In January 2022, Tamar conducted ECC operations off the East Coast of China.

In Feburary/March 2023, Tamar operated in waters of the British Indian Ocean Territory conducting fisheries protection and other missions. Later in March, Tamar joined the French Navy's helicopter assault ship  and frigate  for exercises off Sri Lanka.

References

External links 

 

 

River-class patrol vessels
Ships built on the River Clyde
Ships of the Fishery Protection Squadron of the United Kingdom
2018 ships